Mexcala angolensis is a jumping spider species in the genus Mexcala that lives in Angola. It was first described by Wanda Wesołowska in 2009.

References

Endemic fauna of Angola
Salticidae
Fauna of Angola
Spiders of Africa
Spiders described in 2009
Taxa named by Wanda Wesołowska